Giancarlo Ronchetti (born 29 June 1913; date of death unknown) was an Italian bobsledder who competed in the late 1940s. At the 1948 Winter Olympics in St. Moritz, he finished sixth in the four-man event.

References

Olympic bobsledders of Italy
Bobsledders at the 1948 Winter Olympics
Italian male bobsledders
Year of death missing
1913 births